Shining, The Shining or Shinin may refer to:

Arts and entertainment
The Shining (novel), a 1977 novel by Stephen King
The Shining (film), a 1980 film by Stanley Kubrick starring Jack Nicholson
The Shining (TV miniseries), a 1997 television miniseries
The Shining (opera), a 2016 opera by Paul Moravec and Mark Campbell
Shining (series), a series of fantasy video games made by Sega

Music

Bands

Shining (Norwegian band), a Norwegian experimental jazz band
Shining (Swedish band), a Swedish black metal band
The Shining (band), a band formed by former members of the Verve

Albums

Shining (Marcia Hines album)
 Shining (EP), an EP by Crystal Kay
The Shining (J Dilla album)
The Shining (RBX album)
Dah Shinin', a 1995 album by Smif-N-Wessun
The Shining (Violent J album)
The Shining, an album by IneartheD

Songs
 "Shining" (song), by DJ Khaled featuring Beyoncé and Jay Z
 "Shining", by Amorphis from Tuonela
 "The Shining", by Anorexia Nervosa from Redemption Process
 "The Shining", by Badly Drawn Boy from The Hour of Bewilderbeast
 "The Shining", by Black Sabbath from The Eternal Idol
 "The Shining", by James from Pleased to Meet You
 "Shining", by The Misfits from American Psycho
 "Shining", by Riyu Kosaka
 "Shinin", by Kim Petras from Clarity
 "Shinin", a playable song (skin) in the puzzle video game series, Lumines.

See also 
 Moonshining
 Nitida (disambiguation)
 Shine (disambiguation)
 Shining Star (disambiguation)
 "The Shinning", a segment of The Simpsons episode "Treehouse of Horror V"
 Spotlighting, a method of hunting nocturnal animals using lights